Mohammad Hisham Mahmoud Mohammad Abbas (born September 13, 1963), commonly known as just Hisham Abbas , is an Egyptian pop singer best known for his hit song "Habibi Dah (Nari Narain)" and his religious song "Asmaa Allah al-husna".

Biography
Hisham Abbas was born in Cairo, Egypt. He had his primary education at Dar El Tefl school. Later on he enrolled in American University in Cairo and graduated with a major in mechanical engineering. 

Abbas' career bloomed later on to release several songs. He became popular in the early 1990s with successful hits like "Wana Wana Wana", "Eineha El Sood", "Ta'ala", "Ya Leila", "Shoofi" and his most successful hit, "Habibi Dah (Nari Narain)" featuring Indian singer Jayashri. He currently has 10 solo studio albums to his credit. He received a number of awards, the most notable being Orbit's Arabic Song Award in 1997.

Discography

Studio albums
 Aamel Dagga (2019)
 Matbatalesh (2009)
 Ta'ala Gamby (2007)
 Sebha Tehebbak (2004)
 Gowwa F Alby (2002)
 Habibi Dah (2001)
 Kalam El Leil (1999)
 Shoufi (1999)
 Habaitha (1998)
 Ya Leila (1997)
 Gawabak (1996)
 Zay El Awel (1995)
 Hisham 95 (1995)
 Ard El Sharq (1994)
 Ta'ala (1994)
 Hisham (1992)
 Halah (1992)
 Fainoh
 Sahara

Collections/Compilations
 Ahla Ma Ghanna Hisham Abbas / From The Best of Hisham Abbas
 Atfal
 Hisham Abbas Collection'

Singles
 "Habibi Dah (Nari Narain)
 " [ Halet Hob ( Valentine's Day ) ]

References

1963 births
Living people
20th-century Egyptian male singers
Singers from Cairo
The American University in Cairo alumni
Singers who perform in Classical Arabic
Singers who perform in Egyptian Arabic
21st-century Egyptian male singers
Egyptian male film actors
Egyptian male television actors